James Joseph Colbert (born March 9, 1941) is an American professional golfer.

Colbert was born in Elizabeth, New Jersey. He attended Kansas State University, where he finished second in the NCAA golf championships in 1964, before graduating and turning professional in 1965.

Colbert won eight times on the PGA Tour, including twice in 1983 when he finished a career best fifteenth on the money list.  As a senior Colbert has won 20 tournaments on the Champions Tour, including a senior major championship, the 1993 Senior Players Championship.

Colbert has worked as a golf analyst for ESPN and has his own golf course management company based in Pahrump, Nevada. He also helped design a golf course in Manhattan, Kansas, named Colbert Hills, which was ranked by Golfweek as the best public course in Kansas, and by Golf Digest as the eighth-best course overall in the state.

Colbert was inducted into the Kansas Sports Hall of Fame in 1998.

Thoroughbred racing
With an interest in thoroughbred racing, in 1993 Colbert purchased a racemare named Fit to Lead in partnership with Connie Sczesny and the Chairman of Hollywood Park Racetrack, Randall D. Hubbard. Trained by U.S. Racing Hall of Fame inductee Richard Mandella for the three partners, Fit to Lead won several graded stakes including the Princess Stakes at Hollywood Park plus at Churchill Downs, the Fleur de Lis Stakes and Louisville Budweiser Breeders' Cup Handicap.

Professional wins (35)

PGA Tour wins (8)

PGA Tour playoff record (2–0)

Other wins (1)
1987 Jerry Ford Invitational

Senior PGA Tour wins (20)

*Note: The 1992 Vantage Championship was shortened to 36 holes due to rain.

Senior PGA Tour playoff record (3–5)

Other senior wins (6)
1995 Diners Club Matches (with Bob Murphy)
1996 Diners Club Matches (with Bob Murphy)
2000 Liberty Mutual Legends of Golf (with Andy North)
2001 Liberty Mutual Legends of Golf (with Andy North)
2013 Liberty Mutual Insurance Legends of Golf - Demaret Division (with Bob Murphy)
2014 Big Cedar Lodge Legends of Golf - Legends Division (with Jim Thorpe)

Results in major championships

WD = withdrew
CUT = missed the half-way cut (3rd round cut in 1984 Open Championship)
"T" indicates a tie for a place

Summary

Most consecutive cuts made – 10 (1978 PGA – 1982 PGA)
Longest streak of top-10s – 2 (1974 Masters – 1974 U.S. Open)

Results in The Players Championship

CUT = missed the halfway cut
WD = withdrew
"T" indicates a tie for a place

Champions Tour major championships

Wins (1)

U.S. national team appearances
Professional
Wendy's 3-Tour Challenge (representing Senior PGA Tour): 1996
Gillette Tour Challenge Championship: 1997 (winners with Nick Price and Kelly Robbins)

See also
1965 PGA Tour Qualifying School graduates
List of golfers with most PGA Tour Champions wins

References

External links

Kansas Sports Hall of Fame profile

American male golfers
Kansas State Wildcats men's golfers
PGA Tour golfers
PGA Tour Champions golfers
Winners of senior major golf championships
Golf writers and broadcasters
Golfers from New Jersey
Golfers from Nevada
American sports announcers
American racehorse owners and breeders
Sportspeople from Elizabeth, New Jersey
Sportspeople from Las Vegas
1941 births
Living people